Autobees, Colorado, also called Autobees Plaza, is an extinct town in Colorado. It was the county seat of Huerfano County, Colorado from 1861 to 1868. At that time, the county seat moved to Badito, which was on a main trail along the foothills. When Autobees was the county seat, Huerfano County was almost the entire southeastern portion of the state. Now, the site of the former settlement is within Pueblo County, Colorado.

History

Fort Huerfano
Charles Autobees had a small encampment about 1845 or 1846 on the Huerfano River. The site later became the county seat of Huerfano County. The encampment has been called Fort Huerfano. Across the Arkansas River from the mouth of the Huerfano River was an old Cherokee trail and campground, which is now the town of Boone, Colorado.

Settlement
He left Taos, New Mexico and settled in the area in 1853, establishing a ranch two miles from the confluence of the Arkansas and Huerfano Rivers. He built the ranch within the four million acre Vigil and St. Vrain Land Grant, a Mexican land grant. His goal was to establish a colony near his ranch. There were Native American and Mexican people living at his ranch. The settlement was also called New Huerfano.

He and other residents of the settlement farmed the land, using irrigation ditches for watering the plants. Autobees ran a ferry service across the Arkansas River, which was used by soldiers of the nearby Fort Reynolds. He remained at his ranch until his death. There are no remains of the ranch due to floods and other issues, but there is a monument to Charles Autobees near the site.

References

Further reading

External links
 Early Colorado map

Geography of Pueblo County, Colorado
Pre-statehood history of Colorado
Ghost towns in Colorado
1853 establishments in the United States